Follmer or Föllmer is a surname. Notable people with this surname include:

 Brad Follmer, character in The X-Files
 Clive Follmer (1931–2016), American basketball player
 Cy Follmer, American broadcaster
 Follmer, founder of Follmer, Clogg and Company Umbrella Factory
 Frederick Voris Follmer (1885–1971), American judge
 George Follmer (born 1934), American racing driver
 Hans Föllmer (born 1941), German mathematician
 Karl-Heinz Follmer, member of The Scorpions
Americanized surnames

German-language surnames